Josh Mallard (born March 21, 1980) is a former American football defensive end. He was drafted by the Indianapolis Colts in the seventh round of the 2002 NFL Draft. He played college football at Georgia.

Mallard has also played for the Atlanta Falcons, Denver Broncos, Cincinnati Bengals and Las Vegas Locomotives.

Early years
Mallard played football at Benedictine Military School in Savannah, Ga., where he was a 1996 SuperPrep All-America selection and was named to the Atlanta Journal-Constitution Super Southern 100, Top 50 in Georgia and First-team AAAA All-State honors. Named Savannah Player of the Year by The Savannah News Press. He led his team to the state quarterfinals with 168 tackles and 36 sacks as a senior.

College career
Mallard played in 43 games (7 starts), totaling 74 tackles (50 solo), 18 sacks, five forced fumbles and three passes defensed. He finished his career fifth on the Bulldogs' all-time sacks list. As a senior, Mallard played in 11 games (1 start) posted 20 tackles (12 solo), including five sacks, despite being limited by a knee injury. As a junior, Mallard was credited with 28 tackles (20 solo), including three sacks, a forced fumble and two passes defensed in 11 games (6 starts). Against Auburn, Mallard had 10 tackles and two quarterback pressures. As a sophomore reserve lineman, Mallard played in 11 games (0 starts) and notched 12 tackles (8 solo), two forced fumbles and four sacks. He played in 10 games as a redshirt freshman and made 14 tackles (10 solo), including six sacks, and two forced fumbles.

Professional career

Indianapolis Colts
Mallard was selected by Indianapolis in the seventh round (220th overall) of the 2002 NFL Draft. Mallard played in 13 games (0 starts) for the Colts. He registered 20 tackles (15 solo), including a sack, and three fumble recoveries. In 2003 Mallard spent training camp with Indianapolis, but was waived on August 31, 2003.

Cleveland Browns
He was out of football until the Cleveland Browns signed him on December 10, 2003. He was out of football after the Browns waived him on December 12.

Miami Dolphins
In 2004 Mallard spent the entire season out of football after competing in training camp with the Miami Dolphins. He was waived by the Dolphins on August 30, 2004.

Amsterdam Admirals
In 2005 Mallard spent the season out of football after competing in NFL Europe with the Amsterdam Admirals where he registered 12 tackles, two sacks, two blocked punts and two passes defensed.

Atlanta Falcons
Signed by Atlanta (future contract) on January 4, 2006. In 2006 Mallard recorded eight tackles (7 solo), including four sacks, four forced fumbles, one fumble recovery and defensed two passes in 14 games (1 start) for Atlanta. Mallard was waived by the Atlanta Falcons on October 13, 2007.

Denver Broncos
Mallard joined the Broncos as a free agent on November 6, 2007, after playing in three games with Atlanta (did not record any statistics). With Denver he played 11 games for the year, including his eight contests with Denver, and registered 20 tackles (15 solo), 3.5 sacks, one pass breakup and one forced fumble. They later released him on August 25, 2008.

Cincinnati Bengals
Mallard was signed by the Cincinnati Bengals on November 24, 2008 after defensive ends Robert Geathers and Frostee Rucker were placed on injured reserve. The Bengals released Mallard on December 9, 2008.

Arizona Rattlers
Mallard was assigned to the Arizona Rattlers of the Arena Football League for the 2013 season.

Orlando Predators
On May 2, 2013, Mallard was traded to the Orlando Predators for future considerations. Mallard was reassigned on July 10, 2013.

NFL statistics

References

External links
Cincinnati Bengals bio
Denver Broncos bio

1980 births
Living people
Players of American football from Savannah, Georgia
American football defensive tackles
American football defensive ends
Georgia Bulldogs football players
Indianapolis Colts players
Amsterdam Admirals players
Atlanta Falcons players
Denver Broncos players
Cincinnati Bengals players
Las Vegas Locomotives players
Arizona Rattlers players
Orlando Predators players
American expatriate sportspeople in the Netherlands